Hoepli Editore is an Italian publishing house and bookstore based in Milan founded in 1870 by Swiss bookseller Ulrico Hoepli. Born in 1847 in the village of Tuttwil (now part of Wängi, Canton Thurgau), at the age of 23 Hoepli moved to Milan to take over the family's bookshop in Galleria De Cristoforis, a shopping mall built in 1832 between Corso Vittorio Emanuele and Via Monte Napoleone in the centre of the city. Following an urban development plan, the gallery was demolished in 1931 and replaced by new buildings where the Hoepli bookshop was given a spot in the same area where it was originally located. Over the years, Hoepli significantly expanded its premises. With over 500,000 book titles spread over six floors, Hoepli has established itself as one of Europe's largest bookstores. Both the store and the publishing house are still owned by the Hoepli family.

The first book to be published was a French grammar by Memy Bevilacqua in 1871. The company has subsequently specialized in technical and scientific publications, dictionaries, manuals and instructional books.

In the 1960s, Ulrico Carlo Hoepli, grandson of Carlo, took over. In the 1970s, he developed school publishing. In the 1980s and 1990s, the bookshop's catalog contained around 175,000 titles. The arrival at the presidency of Giovanni Hoepli, son of Ulrico Carlo, directs the catalog more and more towards technology, textbooks, school and university publishing.

See also

List of Italian companies
Books in Italy

References

External links

Publishing companies established in 1870
Book publishing companies of Italy
Companies based in Milan
Mass media in Milan
Italian companies established in 1870
Italian brands
Bookshops of Italy